Édouard-Joseph-Ennemond Mazères (11 September 1796, Paris – 19 March 1866, Paris) was a 19th-century French playwright and librettist.

Biography 
A son of a French colonist of Saint-Domingue, he studied in Paris then joined the army. Lieutenant of infantry, he resigned in 1820 to concentrate on literature. He became Charles X's lecturer but had to leave the post during the July Revolution. In 1832, he was raised to the position of sous-préfet of Saint-Denis, then prefect of Ariège (1835), Aveyron (1837), Haute-Saône (1839) and Cher (1847-1848).

His plays, many of which he wrote with Eugène Scribe, were performed on the most important stages of the Parisian theatre of the 19th century: Théâtre du Gymnase, Théâtre de Madame, Théâtre de l'Odéon, Comédie-Française, Théâtre du Vaudeville, etc.

Works 

1821: L'Album, comedy vaudeville in 1 act, with Louis-Benoît Picard
1821: Un jour a Rome, ou Le jeune homme en loterie, with G. de Lurieu
1821: Monsieur M. Sensible, comedy vaudeville in 1 act
1821: Le Panorama d'Athènes, tableau in couplets
1822: L'Amateur à la porte, ou la Place du Louvre, vaudeville in 1 act
1822: Le Notaire, comedy-vaudeville in 1 act
1822: Une heure de veuvage, comedy-vaudeville
1823: La loge du portier, comedy-vaudeville, with Scribe
1823: Rossini à Paris, ou Le grand dîner, à propos-vaudeville in 1 act, with Scribe
1823: Le bureau de la Loterie, comedy-vaudeville in 1 act, with 
1823: La Vérité dans le vin, comedy-vaudeville in 1 act, with Scribe
1824: Le coiffeur et le perruquier, vaudeville in 1 act, with Charles Nombret Saint-Laurent and Eugène Scribe
1824: L'Enfant trouvé, comedy in 3 acts, with Picard
1824: Les Petites saturnales, comedy in 1 act, mixed with couplets
1825: Le landau ou L'hospitalité, comedy-vaudeville in 1 act, with Picard
1825: Le Charlatanisme, comedy-vaudeville, with Scribe
1825: Les Arrangeuses, ou les Pièces mises en pièces, folie-vaudeville in 1 act, with Nicolas Gersin and Gabriel de Lurieu
1825: L'éligible, comedy in 1 act, with G. de Lurieu et Thomas Sauvage
1825: La Quarantaine, comedy vaudeville
1826: La Coutume allemande, ou les Vacances, comedy vaudeville in 1 act
1826: La Demoiselle de compagnie, comedy-vaudeville in 1 act, with Picard
1826: La Fin du mois, comedy-vaudeville in 1 act
1826: Héritage et mariage, comedy in 3 acts, with Picard
1826: Le jeune mari, comedy in 3 acts
1827: Le Loup-garou, opéra-comique in 1 act, with Scribe
1827: Les trois quartiers, comedie in 3 acts, with Picard
1828: Chacun de son coté, comedy in 3 acts
1828: Les Éphémères, tragi-comedy in 3 acts in prose, preceded with a prologue and followed with an epilogue, with Picard
1828: L'Espion, drama in five acts, with Jacques-Arsène-François-Polycarpe Ancelot
1828: L'oncle d'Amérique, comedy-vaudeville, with Scribe
1829: Le Bon garçon, comedy in 3 acts in prose, with Picard
1830: La Dame et la demoiselle, comedy in 4 acts in prose, with Empis
1830: La mère et la fille, comedy in 5 acts, with Empis
1830: Vatel ou le petit fils d'un grand homme, comedy vaudeville in 1 act, with Scribe
1831: Un changement de ministère, comedy in 5 acts and in prose, with Adolphe-Simonis Empis
1834: Une liaison, 5-act comedy, with Empis
1849: L'Amitié des femmes, 3-act comedy, in prose
1851: Le collier de perles, 3-act comedy
1854: La Niaise, 4-act comedy

Distinction 
 Officer of the Ordre national de la Légion d'honneur, 17 October 1832.

Bibliography 
 Charles Dezobry, Théodore Bachelet, Dictionnaire général de biographie et d'histoire, 1869, p. 2953
 Gustave Vapereau, Dictionnaire universel des contemporains, vol.2, 1870, p. 1239 
 Joseph Marie Quérard, Antoine Alexandre Barbier, Les supercheries littéraires dévoilées, 1874, p. 139
 Ferdinand Natanael Staaff, La littérature française depuis la formation de la langue jusqu'à nos jours, vol.2, 1878, p. 1065
 Patrick Berthier, Le théâtre au XIXe siècle, 1986, p. 78

External links 
 Édouard-Joseph-Ennemond Mazères on data.bnf.fr

19th-century French dramatists and playwrights
French opera librettists
Administrators of the Comédie-Française
Officiers of the Légion d'honneur
Writers from Paris
1796 births
1866 deaths